The 2003–04 Cypriot Second Division was the 49th season of the Cypriot second-level football league. Nea Salamina won their 4th title.

Format
Fourteen teams participated in the 2003–04 Cypriot Second Division. All teams played against each other twice, once at their home and once away. The team with the most points at the end of the season crowned champions. The first three teams were promoted to 2004–05 Cypriot First Division and the last three teams were relegated to the 2004–05 Cypriot Third Division.

Changes from previous season
Teams promoted to 2003–04 Cypriot First Division
 Anagennisi Deryneia
 Doxa Katokopias
 Onisilos Sotira

Teams relegated from 2002–03 Cypriot First Division
 Nea Salamina
 Aris Limassol
 Alki Larnaca

Teams promoted from 2002–03 Cypriot Third Division
 PAEEK FC
 Akritas Chlorakas
 Omonia Aradippou

Teams relegated to 2003–04 Cypriot Third Division
 Chalkanoras Idaliou
 AEK/Achilleas Ayiou Theraponta
 Anagennisi Germasogeias

League standings

Results

See also
 Cypriot Second Division
 2003–04 Cypriot First Division
 2003–04 Cypriot Cup

Sources

Cypriot Second Division seasons
Cyprus
2003–04 in Cypriot football